Dakota Township may refer to the following townships in the United States:

 Dakota Township, Stephenson County, Illinois
 Dakota Township, Adams County, North Dakota